The 2022 Bendigo International was a professional tennis tournament played on outdoor hard courts. It was the fourteenth (women) and second (men) editions of the tournament which was part of the 2022 ATP Challenger Tour and the 2022 ITF Women's World Tennis Tour. It took place in Bendigo, Australia between 3 and 9 January 2022.

Men's singles main-draw entrants

Seeds

 1 Rankings are as of 27 December 2021.

Other entrants
The following players received wildcards into the singles main draw:
  Moerani Bouzige
  Thomas Fancutt
  Omar Jasika
  James McCabe
  Matthew Romios

The following players received entry from the qualifying draw:
  Aaron Addison
  Matthew Dellavedova
  Kody Pearson
  Jaroslav Pospíšil

The following players received entry as lucky losers:
  Charlie Camus
  Cooper Errey

Women's singles main-draw entrants

Seeds

 1 Rankings are as of 27 December 2021.

Other entrants
The following players received wildcards into the singles main draw:
  Catherine Aulia
  Alison Bai
  Talia Gibson
  Alana Parnaby

The following players received entry from the qualifying draw:
  Hanna Chang
  Fernanda Contreras
  Victoria Jiménez Kasintseva
  Yuki Naito
  Whitney Osuigwe
  Kathinka von Deichmann
  You Xiaodi
  Joanne Züger

The following players received entry as a lucky loser:
  Beatrice Gumulya

Champions

Men's singles

  Ernesto Escobedo def.  Enzo Couacaud 5–7, 6–3, 7–5.

Women's singles

  Ysaline Bonaventure def.  Victoria Jiménez Kasintseva, 6–3, 6–1

Men's doubles

  Ruben Bemelmans /  Daniel Masur def.  Enzo Couacaud /  Blaž Rola 7–6(7–2), 6–4.

Women's doubles

  Fernanda Contreras /  Alycia Parks def.  Alison Bai /  Alana Parnaby, 6–3, 6–1

References

External links
 2022 Bendigo International at ITFtennis.com
 2022 Bendigo International at ATPtour.com

2022 ATP Challenger Tour
2022 ITF Women's World Tennis Tour
2022 in Australian tennis
January 2022 sports events in Australia